My Big Fat Greek Life is an American sitcom television series that ran on CBS from February 24 to April 13, 2003. The series is a continuation of the 2002 movie My Big Fat Greek Wedding and was produced by Sony Pictures Television and Tom Hanks's Playtone Productions for CBS.  The two lead characters' names are changed, from Toula and Ian, to Nia and Thomas.

Series star Nia Vardalos also oversaw the show as one of the co-executive producers, along with Hanks and his wife Rita Wilson, who made a guest appearance in one episode as Nia's cousin.

Premise
The series, which is set in Chicago, follows the main character, Nia Portokalos, a Greek-American woman, as she deals with her family and her new non-Greek husband Thomas Miller, an English teacher who still does not seem to fit in with her family's Greek traditions. Despite the help and interference from her family and her husband, Nia tries her best to stay grounded in various situations.

Besides her husband, the family members in her "life" include her parents Maria and Gus, who own the Greek restaurant where she works; her brother Nick, who is not very bright and feels ambivalent toward Thomas; her wise Aunt Voula; and her gossipy cousin Nikki.

While the series follows on from the movie My Big Fat Greek Wedding, the first names of the leading couple have been changed.  In the film, Nia Vardolos' character was Fotoula "Toula" Portokalos; her husband (played in the film by John Corbett) was named Ian Miller.

Ratings
The sitcom premiered with high ratings, averaging 22.9 million viewers. Its debut was the highest-rated premiere of any network sitcom since NBC's Jesse. The following week ratings dropped 28%, averaging 16.5 million viewers, but surpassing FOX's The Simpsons which finished second place. However, the decline in ratings led to the sitcom's eventual cancellation by CBS.

Cast
 Nia Vardalos as Nia Miller
 Steven Eckholdt as Thomas Miller
 Lainie Kazan as Maria Portokalos
 Louis Mandylor as Nick Portokalos
 Michael Constantine as Gus Portokalos
 Andrea Martin as Aunt Voula
 Gia Carides as Nikki

Episodes

References

External links

2003 American television series debuts
2003 American television series endings
2000s American sitcoms
CBS original programming
English-language television shows
Greek-American mass media
Live action television shows based on films
Television series by Sony Pictures Television
Television shows set in Chicago
Television series by Playtone

el:Γάμος...αλά Ελληνικά#My Big Fat Greek Life